Orehovlje is a settlement next to Miren in the Municipality of Miren-Kostanjevica in the Littoral region of Slovenia.

The local church is dedicated to Saint Augustine and belongs to the Parish of Miren.

Locals enjoy swimming at the local weir, tending to their gardens and farming.

References

External links
 Orehovlje on Geopedia

Populated places in the Municipality of Miren-Kostanjevica